Djadochtatherium is a mammal genus that lived in Mongolia during the Upper Cretaceous. It coexisted with some of the late dinosaurs. This animal was a member of the extinct order of Multituberculata. It is within the suborder of Cimolodonta, and a member of the family Djadochtatheriidae. It was named by G. G. Simpson in 1925, the name meaning "Djadokhta beast".

The species Djadochtatherium matthewi was also named by G. G. Simpson in 1925 and has also been known as Catopsalis matthewi (Simpson, 1925). It has been found in the Campanian (Upper Cretaceous)-age Djadokhta and Goyot Formations of Mongolia. This was a relatively large Multituberculate, with a skull length of about 4.5 cm.  It was originally diagnosed as a species within the North American genus of Catopsalis.

References 
 Kielan-Jaworowska Z. and Hurum J. H. (2001), Phylogeny and Systematics of multituberculate mammals. Paleontology 44, p. 389–429.
 Simpson (1925), A Mesozoic mammal skull from Mongolia. American Museum Novitates 201, p. 1–11.
 Much of this information has been derived from  Mesozoic Mammals; Djadochtatherioidea, an Internet directory.

Cretaceous mammals
Cimolodonts
Fossils of Mongolia
Prehistoric mammal genera